This is an incomplete List of ghost towns in Louisiana. Also includes old sawmill towns.

 Albany, Caddo Parish
 Alco, Vernon Parish: Sawmill town (Longleaf area) on LA 465 east of La 117.
 Alma, Pointe Coupee Parish
 Alsatia, East Carroll Parish: Located on US 65 
 Anchor, Pointe Coupee Parish
 Ansley, Jackson Parish
 Ashmore, Rapides Parish: Sawmill town west of Glenmora on Ashmore road.
 Atchafalaya, St. Martin Parish
 Atherton, East Carroll Parish: Located on US 65 north of Transylvania
  Barham, Vernon Parish: Sawmill town, south of Hornbeck on Highway 171. The town was founded when the sawmill of W. R. Pickering began operation.
 Bayou Chene, St. Martin Parish
 Benson, DeSoto Parish: On the KCS line (and hwy 171) south of Mansfield and north of Converse.
 Blanche, Rapides Parish: Sawmill town 
 Bon Ami, Beauregard Parish: South of Deridder 
 Burrwood, Plaquemines Parish
 Carson, Beauregard Parish: Sawmill town founded in 1901 by Central Coal and Coke Company of Kansas City.
 Chasmore, Vernon Parish: Sawmill town located east of Rosepine off Churchman road.
 Cheniere Caminada, Jefferson Parish: Destroyed during the 1893 Cheniere Caminada hurricane.
 Cheneyville, Rapides Parish: Southeast of Alexandria
 Christie, Sabine Pariah: South of Florien on the KCS line and Christie and Eastern Railroad spur to Peason. 
 Cooper, Vernon Parish: Between Leesville and Pickering at Hwy 171 and Cooper Church Road.
 East Krotz Springs, Pointe Coupee Parish
 Elliot City, Pointe Coupee Parish
 False River, Pointe Coupee Parish
 Fazendeville, St. Bernard Parish
 Fisher, Sabine Parish: Sawmill town north of Florien. Boise Cascade bought the mill in 1966 and sold many of the buildings to residents. In 1976 the village started the Fisher Sawmill Days.
 Forbin, Caddo Parish: South of Shreveport
 Frenier, St. John the Baptist Parish
 Frierson, DeSoto Parish
 Gandy, Sabine Parish: South of Florien on Highway 171.
 Good Hope, St. Charles Parish
 Grimes, East Carroll Parish: Located on US 65 south of Transylvania.
 Hawthorn, Vernon Parish: North of Leesville off U.S. Route 171, on Hawthorn road on KCS line.
 Holdup, Rapides Parish: Sawmill town between Forest Hill and Lecompte
 Hollingworth, DeSoto  Parish: North of Mansfield)
 Hollybrook, East Carroll Parish: Located on US 65, south of Lake Providence
 Houston or (Houston River), Calcasieu Parish: On the KCS line between Dequincy and Lake Charles on Louisiana Highway 27 as shown on the 1906 KCS map.
 Hutton, Vernon Parish: Sawmill town between Alco and Seiper on La 465.
 Kingston, DeSoto  Parish
 Kurthwood, Vernon Parish: Sawmill town, north of Leesville, just off LA 117 on La 465, east of historic Alco
 La Balize, Plaquemines Parish
 Lecompte, Rapides Parish: Sawmill town and location of the Pegram Plantation House
 Laurel Valley Village, Lafourche Parish
 Lockport Junction, Calcasieu Parish: On the KCS line between Lake Charles and DeQuincy on hwy 27.
 Longleaf or (Long Leaf), Rapides Parish: Sawmill town that includes the  "Southern Forest Heritage Museum". Located on LA 497, that parallels U.S. 165 between Glenmora and Forest Hill.
 Longville, Beauregard Parish: Sawmill town 
 Loring, Sabine Parish: Located on the KCS line between Zwolle and Many on Hwy 171. 
 McNary, Rapides Parish: Sawmill town on LA 497. Borders the city limits of Glenmora.
 Meridian, Evangeline Parish: Sawmill town 
 Morrisonville, Iberville  Parish
 Morrows, Rapides Parish: Southeast of Alexandria)
 Neame, Vernon Parish (previously known as Keith): Sawmill town that resulted from the building of a sawmill by the Central Coal & Coke Company of Kansas City, Missouri. An abandoned cemetery with 24 identifiable graves, among forest trees on a tract of land on the west side of the highway below the W.D. Chip Mill, and a decayed cemetery and sawmill pond on the east side of the highway, is all that remains of the town.
 Omega, Madison Parish: Located off US 65, northeast of Talla Bena, on Omega road.
 Palmers Mill, Sabine Parish: Located between Converse and Zwolle.
 Pawnee, Allen Parish: Sawmill town 5.5 miles NNE of Oakdale on U.S. Route 165.
 Peason, Sabine Parish: Sawmill town located on LA 118 north of Peason Ridge Wildlife Management Area.
 Pickering, Vernon Parish: On the KCS line, south of Leesville at the intersection of Louisiana hwy 10. Founded and named after W.R. Pickering
 Pitkin,  Vernon Parish
 Red River Landing, Pointe Coupee Parish
 Roosevelt, East Carroll Parish: On US 65 south of Transylvania
 Ruddock, St. John the Baptist
 Seiper, Rapides Parish: Sawmill town located on LA 465
 Sherburne, Pointe Coupee Parish
 Sondheimer, East Carroll  Parish
 Talla Bena, East Carroll Parish: Southeast of Sondheimer on US 65 and on the Delta Southern Railroad.
 Taft, St. Charles Parish
 Torras, Pointe Coupee Parish
 Turner, Calcasieu Parish: On the KCS line between DeQuincy and Lake Charles on LA 27.
 Victoria, Natchitoches Parish
 Ward, Allen Parish: Sawmill town.
 Waterloo, Pointe Coupee Parish

General references
 "Composite map of all railroads in the Long Leaf area from 1905 to present" and historic sawmill towns
 1906 KCS map
 Louisiana Logging Railroads and Mill Equipment, 1917 (Southern Lumberman Saw Mill Directory) Old sawmill towns

Red River and Gulf Railroad
 The Red River and Gulf Railroad later the Missouri Pacific Railroad (MP) then Union Pacific Railroad (UP) ran from Longleaf (Long Leaf) Junction to Forest Hill, Holdup, Togo, and then LeCompte on the Texas & Pacific Railroad (later MP then UP). Southeast the line ran from Longleaf: Louisiana Junction, Audebert, Cocodrie, Causey, and ending at the Rock Island in Mederain. To the northeast from Longleaf: The RR&G went to Big Cut, Melder, Bliss, Elmelhine, Lewiston, Walding, Stille, Hood, Comrade, Mathis, Hutton, Alco, Dusenbury, and ending in Kurthwood.

Notes and references

 
Louisiana
Ghost towns